Colin Barratt (born 21 December 1948) is a British lightweight rower. He won a gold medal at the 1979 World Rowing Championships in Bled with the lightweight men's four, and at the 1980 World Rowing Championships in Hazewinkel with the lightweight men's eight.

Barratt rowed for Durham University Boat Club.

References

1948 births
Living people
British male rowers
World Rowing Championships medalists for Great Britain
Durham University Boat Club rowers